Thomas Cornish (born 15 February 2000) is an Australian track cyclist. He won a silver medal in the 1 km time trial at the 2020 UCI Track Cycling World Championships. He also competed at the 2022 Commonwealth Games in the 1 km time trial, where he won a silver medal, and in the sprint event.

References

External links

Living people
Australian male cyclists
Australian track cyclists
2000 births
Cyclists at the 2022 Commonwealth Games
Commonwealth Games silver medallists for Australia
21st-century Australian people
Commonwealth Games medallists in cycling
UCI Track Cycling World Champions (men)
Cyclists from Sydney
Medallists at the 2022 Commonwealth Games